Mont Pinçon is the highest point of the department of Calvados, in Normandy, with an elevation of .

It was the site of many strategic battles in the Battle of Normandy with the Allied attack in Operation Bluecoat.

External links
 

Mountains of Normandy